Stratiomyella is a genus of flies in the family Stratiomyidae.

Species
Stratiomyella nana James, 1953

References

Stratiomyidae
Brachycera genera
Monotypic Brachycera genera
Diptera of South America
Diptera of North America